Continental Air Services, Inc, better known as CASI, was a subsidiary airline of Continental Airlines set up to provide operations and airlift support in Southeast Asia during the Vietnam War.   CASI was formed as the South-East Asia Division of Continental in April 1965 with operations starting in September 1965 using approximately 22, mainly STOL, aircraft. Continental formed CASI by paying over a million US dollars for BirdAir (Bird and Sons) and its 350 employees and 22 aircraft. CASI aircraft in Laos were registered as Air Continental. As of 1998 Continental Airlines still operated in the Pacific Islands. In 2010 Continental merged into United Airlines.

Organization
CASI, as a Nevada Corporation, was officially located at One East First Street, Reno, Nevada but its headquarters was located at 7300 World Way West, Los Angeles, California. CASI maintained Overseas Offices in Bangkok, Vientiane, and Saigon. CASI's Southeast Asia headquarters was in Vientiane, with operations bases at Phnom Penh, Vientiane, Singapore, Bangkok, and Saigon.

CASI's original purpose was to operate aircraft and ground facilities to support projects involving construction, oil exploration and engineering companies as well as contracts with USAID and other government agencies.
Since CASI was operating under US government contracts CASI had a liaison with the US government, Pierre Salinger, who was designated as Vice-President of the operation.  Because CASI operated in the southeast Asia region to assist the US government at the conclusion of the war Continental Airlines (CAL) was granted a contract with the Micronesian Trust Territory to set up and operate an airline (Air Micronesia) in the Micronesian islands for a designated period (6 years). After the 6 years CAL was to turn over the operation to the Trust Territory authorities but that never happen for a number of reasons.  Today, CAL, now United Airlines, continues to operate in that region with a base in Guam.

Uniforms
Initially CASI uniforms were locally made khaki uniforms which were manufactured in different parts of Laos, Thailand or Vietnam. Some shirts are 2-pocket, others are 4-pocket safari-type jackets. Most CASI pilots were issued the baseball cap. A few of the early CASI pilots were issued the "bus driver" hat. Wings were both US-made and Laotian-made and were worn in Vietnam but not in Laos.

Fleet

CASI/Bird Air were known to operate the following aircraft:
Beech 18
Beech Baron
Beech D50C Twin Bonanza
Bell 47G-3B-1 Sioux
Bell 205
Bell 206A JetRanger
Camair Twin Navion, a Ryan Navion converted by Cameron Aircraft Co
Cessna 180
Cessna 206
Convair CV-440
Curtiss C-46
de Havilland Canada DHC-6 Twin Otter-300
Dornier Do 28A-1 & B-1
Douglas DC-3/C-47 Skytrain
Douglas DC-6A/B
Fairchild Hiller FH-1100
Helio 395 Super Courier
Lockheed PV-2 Ventura
Lockheed L-100-20 Hercules
Pilatus PC-6 Porter & Turbo Porter
Piper PA-18 Super Cub
Scottish Aviation Twin Pioneer Series 2
Short SC.7-3-200 Skyvan

Total fleet: 37 to 45 aircraft by 1976

CASI occasionally leased its assets to others such as:
 Foreign Air Travel Development, Inc
 Boun Oum Airways

See also
 Air America
 Northwest Orient Airlines
 Pacific Corporation
 Rendition aircraft
 Allegations of CIA drug trafficking
 List of defunct airlines of the United States

References

Further reading
 Kenneth Conboy and Don Greer, War in Laos 1954-1975, Squadron/Signal Publications, Inc., Carrollton, Texas 1994. 
 Kenneth Conboy with James Morrison, Shadow War: The CIA's Secret War in Laos, Boulder CO: Paladin Press, 1995. 
 Kenneth Conboy and Simon McCouaig, The War in Laos 1960-75, Men-at-arms series 217, Osprey Publishing Ltd, London 1989. 
 Roger Warner, Shooting at the Moon: The Story of America's Clandestine War in Laos, South Royalton VE: Steerforth Press, 1996.

External links
 CASI Commendation

Continental Airlines
Airlines established in 1965
Vietnam War
Central Intelligence Agency front organizations
Helicopter airlines
Airlines disestablished in 1969
Airlines based in California